Monastery of The Saint Archangels Michael and Gabriel, also known as Binač Monastery, or Buzovik, was a Serbian medieval Eastern Orthodox monastery, built in the 14th century. The church had a rectangular foundation, a semi-round apse and a semi-cylindrical vault. There were two layers of frescoes, one on top of the other. The newer layer, from the 16th century, showed archbishops at liturgy. 

It was located near the town of Vitia. The monastery was destroyed in June 1999, by Albanian extremists.

See also
Destruction of Serbian heritage in Kosovo

Sources 

Medieval Serbian Orthodox monasteries
Serbian Orthodox monasteries in Kosovo
Christian monasteries established in the 14th century
Persecution of Serbs